Dasada may refer to the following:

 Dasada (TV series), a Japanese television series
 Dasada (constituency), an assembly constituency in Gujarat, India